Leslie Watt (17 September 1924 – 15 November 1996) was a New Zealand cricketer who played one Test for New Zealand, against England in March 1955.

Cricket career
In first-class cricket Watt played 48 matches between 1942-43 and 1962-63, making just over 2,000 runs at a batting average of 23.30. He often opened the batting for Otago with Bert Sutcliffe, whose first-class average was more than twice as high.

Watt's highest first-class score was 96 against Auckland in 1950-51, when he and Sutcliffe (who made 275) batted throughout the first day to put on 373 for the first wicket. Later that season the pair put on 178 for the first wicket (Watt making 65) against Central Districts. Otago won the Plunket Shield, Sutcliffe scoring 610 runs and Watt 326 (at an average of 46.57, including a score of 94 against Wellington) in the four matches. It was his most productive season. He was twelfth man in New Zealand's two Tests against England at the end of the season.

In 1954-55, batting at number six for Otago, Watt came third in the Plunket Shield averages with 237 runs at 47.40, and made 37 not out in a trial match for South Island against North Island. He was selected for the First Test at Dunedin, making his Test debut with Noel McGregor and Ian Colquhoun. Batting at number six, he was bowled twice, for 0 and 2. He was replaced in the Second Test team by Matt Poore.

He retired after the 1955-56 season, then returned to play in 1962-63, but Otago lost all five of its matches, and Watt made only 135 runs at 13.50, and did not play again.

See also
 List of Otago representative cricketers
 One-Test wonder

References

External links
 
 

1924 births
1996 deaths
New Zealand cricketers
New Zealand Test cricketers
Otago cricketers
South Island Army cricketers
South Island cricketers